Barbara McGuire is an American politician. A member of the Democratic Party, she represented the eighth district in the Arizona State Senate from 2013 to 2017, and the 23rd district in the Arizona House of Representatives from 2007 through 2011.

However, she declined to run, with the seat being won by Tom O'Halleran. McGuire announced her candidacy for Arizona's 1st district against O'Halleran in the 2020 elections, citing the fact that she perceived him as too conservative.

References

External links

Living people
Women state legislators in Arizona
Democratic Party Arizona state senators
21st-century American politicians
Year of birth missing (living people)
Democratic Party members of the Arizona House of Representatives
Candidates in the 2020 United States elections
21st-century American women politicians